The Pakistani national cricket team toured the West Indies from March 2017 to May 2017. The tour consisted of a series of three Test matches, three One Day Internationals (ODIs) and four Twenty20 internationals (T20Is). The West Indies Cricket Board (WICB) looked at the possibility of playing the T20I matches at the Central Broward Regional Park in Florida, as they did against India in August 2016. However, the WICB kept all the fixtures for this tour in the Caribbean.

In January 2017, the Pakistan Cricket Board (PCB) made an offer to the WICB to play two T20I matches in Pakistan. They would have been held in Lahore on 18 and 19 March 2017, with the teams playing two more T20Is in Lauderhill, Florida. However, when the tour fixtures were confirmed by the WICB on 12 January 2017, there was no mention of the matches in Pakistan. Later the same day the WICB confirmed that the West Indies would not play in Pakistan due to security concerns. Originally the tour was scheduled to contain two T20I matches, but early in March 2017, two extra T20I fixtures were added to the schedule.

Ahead of the tour, Misbah-ul-Haq confirmed he would continue as captain of the Pakistan Test side, a decision accepted by the PCB. In April 2017, Misbah announced that he would be retiring from international cricket at the end of the series. Two days later, Younis Khan also announced that he would retire from Test cricket following the conclusion of the series.

Pakistan won the T20I series 3–1, and the ODI series 2–1. They also won the Test series 2–1, their first Test series win in the West Indies.

Squads

Veerasammy Permaul was added to the West Indies ODI squad ahead of the third match as cover for Shannon Gabriel.

First-class match: West Indies President's XI v Pakistan

T20I series

1st T20I

2nd T20I

3rd T20I

4th T20I

ODI series

1st ODI

2nd ODI

3rd ODI

Test series

1st Test

2nd Test

3rd Test

References

External links
 Series home at ESPN Cricinfo

2016 in Pakistani cricket
2016 in West Indian cricket
Pakistani cricket tours of the West Indies
International cricket competitions in 2016–17